A spectrochemical series is a list of ligands ordered by ligand "strength", and a list of metal ions based on oxidation number, group and element. For a metal ion, the ligands modify the difference in energy Δ between the d orbitals, called the ligand-field splitting parameter in ligand field theory, or the crystal-field splitting parameter in crystal field theory. The splitting parameter is reflected in the ion's electronic and magnetic properties such as its spin state, and optical properties such as its color and absorption spectrum.

Spectrochemical series of ligands
The spectrochemical series was first proposed in 1938 based on the results of absorption spectra of cobalt complexes.

A partial spectrochemical series listing of ligands from small Δ to large Δ is given below. (For a table, see the ligand page.)

I− < Br− < S2− < SCN−  (S–bonded) < Cl− < NO3– < N3− < F− < OH− < C2O42− < H2O < NCS− (N–bonded) < CH3CN < py (pyridine) < NH3 < en (ethylenediamine) <  bipy (2,2'-bipyridine) < phen (1,10-phenanthroline) < NO2− (N–bonded) < PPh3 (Triphenylphosphine) < CN− < CO

Weak field ligands: H2O, F−, Cl−, OH−

Strong field ligands: CO, CN−, NH3, PPh3

Ligands arranged on the left end of this spectrochemical series are generally regarded as weaker ligands and cannot cause forcible pairing of electrons within the 3d level, and thus form outer orbital octahedral complexes that are high spin. On the other hand, ligands lying at the right end are stronger ligands and form inner orbital octahedral complexes after forcible pairing of electrons within 3d level and hence are called low spin ligands.

However, it is known that "the spectrochemical series is essentially backwards from what it should be for a reasonable prediction based on the assumptions of crystal field theory."  This deviation from crystal field theory highlights the weakness of crystal field theory's assumption of purely ionic bonds between metal and ligand.

The order of the spectrochemical series can be derived from the understanding that ligands are frequently classified by their donor or acceptor abilities. Some, like NH3, are σ bond donors only, with no orbitals of appropriate symmetry for π bonding interactions. Bonding by these ligands to metals is relatively simple, using only the σ bonds to create relatively weak interactions. Another example of a σ bonding ligand would be ethylenediamine; however, ethylenediamine has a stronger effect than ammonia, generating a larger ligand field split, Δ.

Ligands that have occupied p orbitals are potentially π donors. These types of ligands tend to donate these electrons to the metal along with the σ bonding electrons, exhibiting stronger metal-ligand interactions and an effective decrease of Δ. Most halide ligands as well as OH− are primary examples of π donor ligands.

When ligands have vacant π* and d orbitals of suitable energy, there is the possibility of pi backbonding, and the ligands may be π acceptors. This addition to the bonding scheme increases Δ. Ligands that do this very effectively include CN−, CO, and many others.

Spectrochemical series of metals
The metal ions can also be arranged in order of increasing Δ, and this order is largely independent of the identity of the ligand.

Mn2+ < Ni2+ < Co2+ < Fe2+ < V2+ < Fe3+ < Cr3+ < V3+ < Co3+

In general, it is not possible to say whether a given ligand will exert a strong field or a weak field on a given metal ion. However, when we consider the metal ion, the following two useful trends are observed:
Δ increases with increasing oxidation number, and
Δ increases down a group.

See also

References
Zumdahl, Steven S. Chemical Principles Fifth Edition. Boston: Houghton Mifflin Company, 2005. Pages 550-551 and 957-964.
D. F. Shriver and P. W. Atkins Inorganic Chemistry 3rd edition, Oxford University Press, 2001. Pages: 227-236.
James E. Huheey, Ellen A. Keiter, and Richard L. Keiter Inorganic Chemistry: Principles of Structure and Reactivity 4th edition, HarperCollins College Publishers, 1993. Pages 405-408.

Inorganic chemistry
Coordination chemistry